Cypress Christian School (CCS), formerly Cypress Community Christian School, is a private, non-profit, K-12 Christian school located in unincorporated northwest Harris County, Texas, near Cypress and Houston.

The school was founded in 1978. As of October 2021, it has 688 students. 255 are in elementary school (K-5), 182 are in middle school (6–8), and 251 are in high school (9–12). In 2021, the school won the prestigious TAPPS 4A Henderson Cup, naming Cypress Christian School the top 4A private school in Texas.

Academics

Cypress Christian School is accredited by the Association of Christian School International (ACSI) and AdvancED. ACSI is an accreditation agency approved by the Texas Private School Accreditation Commission (TEPSAC).

Cypress Christian School is one of approximately 1,500 high schools worldwide to be recognized as an AP Capstone School. This innovative College Board program consists of two courses, AP Seminar and AP Research, taken during the junior and senior year of high school. The courses teach students skills including college-level independent research, collaboration, teamwork, writing and communication.

Athletics

Cypress Christian School offers football, volleyball, cross country, cheerleading, boys & girls soccer, boys & girls basketball, swimming, baseball, softball and boys & girls track & field in middle school and high school. Golf is also available in high school. Elementary students may participate in boys & girls soccer, boys & girls basketball, baseball and softball.

In the 2020-2021 season, both the Boys Track & Field and the Girls Track & Field teams won the TAPPS 4A State Championship. Head Football Coach, Kris Hogan was named TAPPS Male Coach of the Year.

In the 2017–2018 season, three teams won TAPPS 4A State Championships – Football, Baseball and Boys Track & Field. Individual athletes were also state champions in Boys Track & Field (Triple Jump, Long Jump, 110 m. Hurdles, 300 m. Hurdles) and Boys Swimming (100 y. Backstroke – breaking his own State record). Head Football Coach, Jacob Spenn was named TAPPS Male Coach of the Year.

In the 2016–2017 season, an athlete was state champion in Boys Swimming (100 y. Backstroke – breaking the State record). In the 2015–2016 season, individual athletes were state champions in Boys Track & Field (Shot Put) and Girls Track & Field (100 m. Dash, 200 m. Dash). In the 2014–2015 season, individual athletes were state champions in Girls Track & Field (Triple Jump, 200 m. Dash). In the 2013–2014 season, two teams won State Championships – Baseball and Girls Track & Field. In the 2012–2013 season, individual athletes were state champions in Boys Track & Field (110 m. Dash) and Girls Track & Field (Triple Jump). In the 2011–2012 season, individual athletes were state champions in Boys Track & Field (High Jump) and Boys Golf. In the 2008–2009 season, an individual athlete was state champion in Girls Track & Field (High Jump, Shot Put, 100 m. Hurdles, 300 m. Hurdles). In the 2007–2008 season, an individual athlete was state champion in Girls Track & Field (High Jump, Shot Put). In the 2006–2007 season and individual athlete was state champion in Boys Cross Country. In the 2005–2006 season, an individual athlete was state champion in Boys Track & Field (3200 m. Run). In the 2003–2004 season, an individual athlete was state champion in Boys Track & Field (300 m. Hurdles). The Boys Basketball team won state championships in each of the 2002–2003, 2004–2005, 2005–2006 and 2006–2007 seasons.

Fine Arts
Cypress Christian School offers art classes for grades K-12, drama beginning in sixth grade, middle school and high school choir and drumline and hornline in high school. Middle school and high school students participate in musical performances and competitions throughout the year. The Fine Arts Department produces an annual musical.

Student life 
Cypress Christian School has multiple student clubs and activities, including:

 Warrior Leadership Academy
 National Junior Honor Society
 National Honor Society
 National Art Honor Society
 Fellowship of Christian Athletes (FCA)
 Ambassador Council
 Warrior Tribes
 Yearbook Team

Notable alumni
 Hasheem Thabeet

References

Further reading
 Harris County Block Book Maps: Volume 119, Page 258: Cypress Community Christian School. PDF  and JPG

External links

 Cypress Christian School

Christian schools in Texas
Private K-12 schools in Harris County, Texas
Educational institutions established in 1978
1978 establishments in Texas